"Fa Fa" is Guster's second single released off the Lost and Gone Forever album. It is also on the live CD and DVD Guster on Ice. * Karl Denson from The Greyboy Allstars plays the saxophone and flute on the song, which received modest radio airplay, peaking at #26 on the Billboard Adult Top 40 chart.

References 

Guster songs
Song recordings produced by Steve Lillywhite
2000 singles
1998 songs